David A. Krumm (born 1967) is a retired lieutenant general in the United States Air Force who served as commander, Alaskan Command and Eleventh Air Force. He was commissioned in 1989 through ROTC at Auburn University.

Effective dates of promotions

References

1967 births
Living people
Auburn University alumni
United States Air Force generals